In mathematics, limit cardinals are certain cardinal numbers. A cardinal number λ is a weak limit cardinal if  λ is neither a successor cardinal nor zero. This means that one cannot "reach" λ from another cardinal by repeated successor operations. These cardinals are sometimes called simply "limit cardinals" when the context is clear.

A cardinal λ is a strong limit cardinal if λ cannot be reached by repeated powerset operations. This means that λ is nonzero and, for all κ < λ, 2κ < λ. Every strong limit cardinal is also a weak limit cardinal, because κ+ ≤ 2κ for every cardinal κ, where κ+ denotes the successor cardinal of κ.

The first infinite cardinal,  (aleph-naught), is a strong limit cardinal, and hence also a weak limit cardinal.

Constructions 

One way to construct limit cardinals is via the union operation:  is a weak limit cardinal, defined as the union of all the alephs before it; and in general  for any limit ordinal λ is a weak limit cardinal.

The ב operation can be used to obtain strong limit cardinals.  This operation is a map from ordinals to cardinals defined as

 (the smallest ordinal equinumerous with the powerset)
If λ is a limit ordinal, 
The cardinal

is a strong limit cardinal of cofinality ω. More generally, given any ordinal α, the cardinal

is a strong limit cardinal. Thus there are arbitrarily large strong limit cardinals.

Relationship with ordinal subscripts 

If the axiom of choice holds, every cardinal number has an initial ordinal. If that initial ordinal is  then the cardinal number is of the form  for the same ordinal subscript λ. The ordinal λ determines whether  is a weak limit cardinal. Because  if λ is a successor ordinal then  is not a weak limit. Conversely, if a cardinal κ is a successor cardinal, say  then  Thus, in general,  is a weak limit cardinal if and only if λ is zero or a limit ordinal.

Although the ordinal subscript tells us whether a cardinal is a weak limit, it does not tell us whether a cardinal is a strong limit. For example, ZFC proves that  is a weak limit cardinal, but neither proves nor disproves that  is a strong limit cardinal (Hrbacek and Jech 1999:168). The generalized continuum hypothesis states that  for every infinite cardinal κ. Under this hypothesis, the notions of weak and strong limit cardinals coincide.

The notion of inaccessibility and large cardinals 

The preceding defines a notion of "inaccessibility": we are dealing with cases where it is no longer enough to do finitely many iterations of the successor and powerset operations; hence the phrase "cannot be reached" in both of the intuitive definitions above. But the "union operation" always provides another way of "accessing" these cardinals (and indeed, such is the case of limit ordinals as well).  Stronger notions of inaccessibility can be defined using cofinality. For a weak (respectively strong) limit cardinal κ the requirement is that cf(κ) = κ (i.e. κ be regular) so that κ cannot be expressed as a sum (union) of fewer than κ smaller cardinals. Such a cardinal is called a weakly (respectively strongly) inaccessible cardinal. The preceding examples both are singular cardinals of cofinality ω and hence they are not inaccessible.

 would be an inaccessible cardinal of both "strengths" except that the definition of inaccessible requires that they be uncountable.  Standard Zermelo–Fraenkel set theory with the axiom of choice (ZFC) cannot even prove the consistency of the existence of an inaccessible cardinal of either kind above , due to Gödel's incompleteness theorem.  More specifically, if  is weakly inaccessible then .  These form the first in a hierarchy of large cardinals.

See also 

 Cardinal number

References

External links
 http://www.ii.com/math/cardinals/ Infinite ink on cardinals

Set theory
Cardinal numbers